Iver C. Ranum High School was a public secondary school operated by Adams County School District 50 near Westminster, Colorado, United States, from 1961 to 2010.  The high school was located in the Sherrelwood neighborhood in Adams County.  It was named in honor of Iver Ranum, Superintendent of Adams County School District 50 from 1950 to 1975.  The last class of Ranum High School graduated on May 8, 2010.  The high school has been replaced by the new Westminster High School.

The building that housed Iver C. Ranum High School currently houses Iver C. Ranum Middle School.

Demographics
Hispanic 63.1%
White 27.5%
African American 1.7%
Asian 7.0%
Native American 0.7% 

58% of Ranum's students received free/reduced lunch.

Outstanding Alumni 
 Charles Pelkey (1976), Wyoming House of Representatives, representing House House District 45, Laramie, from 2015 to 2021. He served as House Minority Whip from 2017 to 2021.
 Chad Ashton (1986)

Academic program
The school offered the International Baccalaureate program.

See also
Adams County School District 50
List of high schools in Colorado
State of Colorado

References

External links
Iver C. Ranum Middle School website

Public high schools in Colorado
Westminster, Colorado
International Baccalaureate schools in Colorado
Schools in Adams County, Colorado
Educational institutions established in 1961
Educational institutions disestablished in 2010
1961 establishments in Colorado
2010 disestablishments in Colorado